Shpend Ali Ahmeti (born 18 April 1978, Pristina) is a Kosovo Albanian politician who served as the Mayor of Pristina. He was leader of the New Spirit Party, which merged into Vetëvendosje in 2011, and served as their vice chairman. However, after internal disputes he left the party in 2018 to become the leader of the Social Democratic Party of Kosovo. In 2019 he became an independent politician.

Ahmeti lectured public policy at the American University in Kosovo before he became mayor.

In the first round of elections on 3 November 2013, Ahmeti was around 8,000 votes behind Isa Mustafa, but in the second round on 1 December 2013 he won by around 2,500 votes. Mustafa accused Ahmeti of fraud. Ahmeti's win was confirmed afterwards ending 15 years of LDK tenure in the capital of Kosovo.

In October 2017 he run for the local elections as a candidate of Vetëvendosje again and successfully managed to keep his position as mayor of Prishtina.

Education

He has completed university studies in Economics and Business Administration at the American University in Bulgaria, during the years 1996–2000, specializing in Applied Economics and Business Administration. During the studies between the years 1999–2002, Mr. Ahmeti was senator and then the President of the Student Government at American University in Bulgaria, as well as leader of various communities (from more than ten countries) through the period of reforms at university. At the American Universities, involvement in the students’ government is the experience that combines knowledge, organization, confronting the protection of the rights and responsibility of faith from friends and colleagues.

Employment
Ahmeti worked for World Bank on Kosovo's Public Expenditure Review, and for European Bank of Reconstruction and Development.

References

Living people
1978 births
Mayors of Pristina
Vetëvendosje politicians
Harvard Kennedy School alumni